The 2021 Dwars door het Hageland was the 18th edition of the Dwars door het Hageland road cycling one-day race, which was held on 5 June 2021 in the Belgian province of Flemish Brabant. It was a 1.Pro event on the 2021 UCI Europe Tour and the 2021 UCI ProSeries calendars, and the fourth event of the 2021 Belgian Road Cycling Cup.

Teams 
Four of the nineteen UCI WorldTeams, eight UCI ProTeams, and eight UCI Continental teams made up the twenty teams that participated in the race. Of the 137 riders to start the race, 75 finished.

UCI WorldTeams

 
 
 
  (Withdrawn)
 

UCI ProTeams

 
 
 
 
 
 
 
 

UCI Continental Teams

Result

References

External links 

Dwars door het Hageland
Dwars door het Hageland
Dwars door het Hageland
Dwars door het Hageland